The Basilica of Jesus the Adolescent, also known as the Salesian church (Arabic: كنيسة السالزيان) is a Catholic church in Nazareth in Israel, belonging to the Salesians of Don Bosco. The church is located next to the school of the Salesians. In Gothic style, was built between 1906 and 1923 on a hill called "Mount of the Start" which overlooks the city, where, according to tradition, Jesus spent his youth.

From the terrace of the church there is an exceptional view of the old city of Nazareth.

See also 
Roman Catholicism in Israel
Holy Family Church (disambiguation)

References

Roman Catholic churches in Nazareth
Roman Catholic churches completed in 1923
Basilica churches in Israel
20th-century Roman Catholic church buildings in Israel